This is a list of diplomatic missions in Romania. There are 84 diplomatic missions in Bucharest and many countries maintain consulates in other Romanian cities. Also, several other countries have non-resident embassies accredited from other European capitals.

This listing excludes honorary consulates.

Embassies in Bucharest

Other posts 
 (Embassy office)
 (Delegation)

Gallery

Consulates-General

Cluj-Napoca

Constanța

Iași

Miercurea Ciuc

Sibiu
 (Consulate)

Timișoara
 (Consulate)

Non-resident embassies accredited to Romania 

  (Warsaw)
  (Belgrade)
  (Athens)
  (Berlin)
  (London)
  (Moscow)
  (Moscow)
  (Sofia)
  (Warsaw)
  (Moscow)
  (Brussels)
  (Budapest)
  (Moscow)
  (London)
  (Geneva)
  (Vienna)
  (Paris)
  (Prague)
  (Vienna)
  (Belgrade)
  (Rome)
  (Rome)
  (Warsaw)
  (Moscow)
  (Berlin)
  (Berlin)
  (Vienna)
  (Warsaw)
  (Rome)
  (Athens)
  (Berlin/Geneva)
  (Berlin)
  (Berlin)
  (Valletta)
  (Rome)
  (Vienna)
  (Brussels)
  (Berlin)
  (Berlin)
  (Rome)
  (Athens)
  (Rome)
  (Budapest)
  (Berlin)
  (Moscow)
  (Warsaw)
  (Berlin)
  (Berlin)
  (Berlin)
  (Canberra)
  (Berlin)
  (Rome)

Closed missions

See also 
 List of diplomatic missions of Romania
 Foreign relations of Romania
 Visa requirements for Romanian citizens

References

External links 
 Foreign missions in Romania
 Consulates-General in Romania

List
Romania
Diplomatic missions